Moninya Roughan is a professor of Oceanography at the University of New South Wales Australia,. Roughan is the head of the Coastal and Regional Oceanography Lab  and is an authority on the oceanography of the East Australian Current. She has led major projects for industry, government, the Australian Research Council and the New Zealand Ministry of Business Innovation and Employment.  She has held leadership roles in Australia's Integrated Marine Observing System since 2007.

Roughan researches the dynamics of the coastal ocean and their interaction with the western boundary current. She is an expert in marine heatwaves, the coastal ocean circulation, nutrient enrichment processes and their biological impact She is primarily focussed on the East Australian Current its effects on the waters of the continental shelf. The work involves the use of observations and numerical models.

Early life and education 
Roughan grew up in Ku-ring-gai Council area of Sydney Australia, a granddaughter of Winsome Andrew, one of Australia's award winning and first female architects, and  great grand daughter of Captain E. H. Andrew, first master of the wool clipper Cromdale.

She attended Loreto College, Normanhurst where she was Barry House Music captain.

She earned a BSc (Honours Class 1) in Oceanography at the University of New South Wales in 1998 and a PhD in Oceanography at the University of New South Wales in 2002.

Career 
During 2017–2019, Roughan worked in industry, most recently as Head of Research Partnerships for the NZ Meteorological Service.

Roughan was promoted to associate professor in 2015 and Professor in 2019.
One of three first female professors in the school of mathematics and statistics at UNSW with Frances Kuo and Catherine Greenhill and one of the first two female Oceanography professors in Australia with Katrin Meissner.

Research interests and impact 
Roughan's work has been funded by the Australia Research Council, Australian Federal and State Government programs, the New Zealand Ministry of Business Industry and Education, the US Office of Naval Research. She also undertakes contracted research and consultancy.

Recent work has focussed on drivers of ocean warming in the East Australian Current and drivers of ocean warming in the western boundary currents of the Southern Hemisphere. 

Since 2006, Roughan has taken a key roll in the design, deployment and ongoing development of one of the most comprehensive ocean observing systems in the southern hemisphere through her involvement in Australia's Integrated Marine Observing System.  She has served on the NSW-IMOS leadership team since inception, including serving as leader and deputy leader of NSW IMOS node from 2007–2013 and a continuing member of the National Coastal Mooring Network Steering Committee. She leads the NSW-IMOS moorings sub-facility responsible for the continued deployment and maintenance of up to 10 oceanographic moorings along the coast of SE Australia. She continues to lead the science driving the deployment of ocean gliders and radar along the length of the East Australian Current. In recognition of her contribution to ocean observing she was invited to join the scientific programme committee for Ocean Obs2019, a once per decade conference on Ocean Observing.

Roughan was inaugural director of the Moana Project 2017–2020 an $11.5M MBIE funded project to investigate Marine heatwaves and ocean dynamics around New Zealand.

Research cruises 
Roughan will lead an upcoming 24 day voyage on the RV Investigator in Austral Spring 2023 (IN2023_V06) funded by a large Australian Research Council Discovery Project Grant

Roughan has previously led research voyages aboard several of Australia's Marine National Facility research vessels including the RV Investigator IN2015 V03 (Brisbane- Sydney)

and the RV Southern Surveyor ST 02/2006 (Sydney–Noumea).

She has also participated in two scientific cruises to the Antarctic: Antarctic Astrolabe 2000 and the RV Aurora Australis RV Aurora Australis.

Roughan was aboard the Aurora Australis on its first winter voyage to the Antarctic, a seven-week expedition to explore, the Mertz Glacier Polynya, when a fire broke out in the engine room while the ship was deep within the ice. 

Roughan has served on the Australian Marine National Facility Research Advisory Committee since 2017.

Prizes, honours and awards 

Roughan was elected a Fellow of the Royal Society of New South Wales  in 2022.  Her other awards include:
 2016, Seeyle Fellowship, University of Auckland, Auckland, New Zealand
 2015, China High End Foreign Experts Award, ECNU, Shanghai, China
 2002, American Geophysical Union Outstanding Student Paper award in Physical Oceanography
 1998, Australian Post Graduate Award 3 year Scholarship UNSW, Australia
 1996, Sam Cracknell Memorial Scholarship UNSW, Australia

Selected publications

References 

Living people
Year of birth missing (living people)
University of New South Wales alumni
Academic staff of the University of New South Wales
Australian oceanographers